The Shenyang J-6 (Chinese: 歼-6; designated F-6 for export versions; NATO reporting name: Farmer) is the Chinese-built version of the Soviet MiG-19 'Farmer' fighter aircraft, the world's first mass-produced supersonic aircraft.

Design and development

Although the MiG-19 had a comparatively short life in Soviet service, the Chinese came to value its agility, turning performance, and powerful cannon armament, and produced it for their own use between 1958 and 1981. While the basic Soviet-built MiG-19 has been retired from all nations, the Shenyang J-6 still flies for nine of its original 15 operators, however, in a very limited capacity. The J-6 airframe contributed to the Chinese ground attack version, the Q-5, which still flies for numerous nations.

The J-6 was considered "disposable" and was intended to be operated for only 100 flight hours (or approximately 100 sorties) before being overhauled. The Pakistan Air Force was often able to extend this to 130 hours with diligent maintenance.

A number of J-6 based at Lianchen and Yantan-li bases appeared to have been converted into unmanned aircraft. Work on unmanned J-6 was first reported in 2013.

Description

The J-6 has a maximum speed at altitude of 1,540 km/h (960 mph), Mach 1.45. Service ceiling is 17,900 m (58,700 ft). Combat radius with two drop tanks is about 640 km (400 mi). The aircraft is powered by two Liming Wopen-6A (Tumansky R-9) turbojet engines. In addition to the internal cannon armament, most have provision for four wing pylons for up to 250 kg (550 lb) each, with a maximum ordnance load of 500 kg (1,100 lb). Typical stores include unguided bombs, 55 mm rocket pods, or PL-2/PL-5 (Chinese versions of Soviet K-13 (NATO AA-2 'Atoll') air-to-air missiles.

Operational history

Albania
Albanian Air Force J-6s replaced the J-5s on the border to intercept Yugoslav incursions into Albanian airspace. However, the J-6 was ineffective against the faster Yugoslav MiG-21 'Fishbed'. Once the F-7A became available, the J-6 was redeployed to protect Tirana. As of 2005 all Albanian fighters were grounded due to a lack of spare parts.

Pakistan 

Between 1965–1980, the Pakistan Air Force (PAF) received 260 F-6 fighters which went on to serve with 10 PAF squadrons at various times. During their service, Pakistani F-6s also underwent 140 modifications at the Pakistan Aeronautical Complex to improve its capabilities in the interceptor and close air support roles. These modifications included installation of Martin-Baker ejection seats, Gun cameras, Western Avionics, AIM-9B/J/P missiles, French 68mm SNEB rockets, underbelly "Gondola" fuel tanks and a special ground power unit to quickly start it's two engines in order to shorten scramble time.

1971 Indo-Pakistani War 

When the 1971 War broke out, the PAF had operationalized three F-6 squadrons which were the No. 11, No. 23 & No. 25 Squadrons. The F-6s of these squadrons collectively flew 945 sorties out of which 834 were combat ones.
Air to Air Combat
Throughout the war, the F-6 flew 650 Air Defence sorties in which they shot down approximately 8 Indian warplanes while damaging 2 more.

On 4 December 1971, Flight Lieutenant Javaid Latif of the No. 23 Squadron shot down an Su-7 over Risalewala Airfield while Flying Officer Qazi Javed of the No. 25 Squadron shot down a Hawker Hunter over Mianwali Airfield.

On 5 December 1971, Wing Commander Saad Hatmi (the Officer Commanding of the No. 25 Squadron) and his wingman Flight Lt. Shahid Raza shot down 2 Indian Hunters near Sakesar.

On 7 December 1971,Flight Lt. Atiq Sufi of the No. 11 Squadron shot down an Su-7 near samba.

On 8 December 1971, Wing Commander Hashmi shot down a Su-7 which was attacking the Risalewala Airfield.

On 14 December 1971, Flight Lieutenant Amir Sharif of No. 11 Squadron claimed to have shot down a superior IAF Mig-21 over Shakargarh.
Ground Attack
Moreover, the F-6 flew 184 Ground Attack sorties where their 3 x 30 mm guns and 57 mm S-5 rockets were particularly effective against Indian armour, military vehicles, bunkers, and troop concentrations. Their Close Air Support missions at Shakargarh were the most successful.

At the end of the war, the PAF had lost two F-6s to ground fire while losing one F-6 to an Indian Su-7. An F-6 was also lost to friendly fire.

Some notable Pakistani F-6 pilots are Mushaf Ali Mir who later became the PAF's Chief, Wajid Ali Khan who was taken as a POW after being shot down by Indian AAA, he later became a Member of the Parliament in Canada and Syed Manzoor ul Hassan Hashmi. The single-seat F-6 was retired from the Pakistan Air Force in 2002 and replaced with the Chengdu F-7P/PG aircraft.

Vietnam War
The supersonic speed advantage provided by the MiG-21's more modern turbojet engine was found to be not as useful in combat as originally thought, because aerial dogfights at the time were conducted almost entirely at subsonic speeds. The J-6 (and hence the MiG-19 too) was found to be more manoeuvrable than the MiG-21 and, although slower, its acceleration during dogfights was considered adequate. The North Vietnamese Air Force fielded at least one unit of J-6s during the war, the 925th Fighter Regiment, beginning in 1969.

Somalia
Somalia ordered at least eleven F-6Cs and two FT-6s in 1979. Deliveries started in 1980. They were used during border skirmishes with Ethiopia in 1981, and they also saw combat during the Somali Rebellion, in the second half of the 1980s and until 1991.

Sudan
Twelve F-6 fighters and two FT-6 trainers were reportedly delivered to the Sudanese Air Force, starting in 1973. Moreover, twelve F-6Cs were delivered between 1981 and 1983. Another batch of twelve F-6Cs might have been acquired in 1990, as well as two FT-6s in 2001. Sudanese F-6s participated in the Second Sudanese Civil War, from the 1980s to the early 1990s. One F-6 was claimed shot down by the rebels in 1988, and two more in the autumn of 1991.

Uganda-Tanzania War
The Tanzania Air Force Command received its first batch of twelve F-6s starting in June 1973. An additional twelve F-6Cs and up to four FT-6s were also delivered in 1982. Tanzanian F-6s participated in the 1978–1979 Uganda-Tanzania War. However, they aren't known to have been involved in any air-to-air combats.

Zambia
Twelve F-6s were delivered to the Zambian Air Force, probably between 1976 and 1978. On 8 June 1980, Zambian F-6s intercepted and shot down an Angolan Yakovlev Yak-40, under unknown circumstances.

Kampuchea-Vietnam War

In the era of Khmer Rouge control of Cambodia (1975–1979), Chinese-supplied Khmer J-6s participated in Kampuchea-Vietnamese border clashes for ground attacks. During the Vietnamese invasion in 1978, the Cambodian aircraft were reluctant to take-off to intercept the Vietnamese ones, thus the Vietnamese captured a number of J-6s and put them on public display.

Iran–Iraq War
During the 1980–88 Iran–Iraq War, both sides deployed J-6 fighter jets. Documents from the US Defense Intelligence Agency released under the Freedom of Information Act (United States) on Chinese arms sales to Iran reveal that between 1980 and 1987 China delivered 100 J-6 fighter jets to Iran. Iraq's J-6 fighters were transferred from the Egyptian Air Force. Most missions J-6s performed during the Iran-Iraq War were air-to-ground attack.

Variants

 Shenyang J-6 – (a.k.a. Type 59, Dongfeng-102, Product 47 and F-6) Despite having no suffix to the designation, the J-6 appeared after the initial production of the J-6A had begun. The J-6 was equivalent, but not identical, to the MiG-19S.
 Shenyang J-6A – (a.k.a. Type 59A, Dongfeng-103, Jianjiji-6 Jia) – Early production from 1958 to 1960 was sub-standard and not accepted by the PLAAF. Production was halted, the jigs scrapped, and production restarted with assistance from the USSR. The J-6A was equivalent to the MiG-19P. The maiden flight was made by Wang Shuhuai on 17 December 1958. Only around 100 aircraft from this version were produced. It was reported that the J-6A never actually passed the PLAAF's tests. The planes were of little operational value and suffered from quality issues, flight characteristics were much lower than those of the J-6.
 Shenyang J-6A – Production of the J-6 restarted after new assembly jigs, and other assistance, acquired from the USSR. Similar to MiG-19PF, an all-weather radar-equipped interceptor with two NR-30 30mm cannon. Exported as the F-6A.
 J-6B – (a.k.a. Type 59B, Dongfeng-105 and Jianjiji-6 Yi) Similar to MiG-19PM "Farmer-D", interceptor with two PL-1 (Chinese version of Soviet K-5 (AA-1 'Alkali') beam-riding air-to-air missiles; it is unclear if the J-6B retains its cannon. Only 19 J-6Bs were built by Nanchang Aircraft Mfg. Co. before the programme was terminated.
 J-6C – (a.k.a. Jianjiji-6 Bing, Product 55 and F-6C) Day fighter version with three 30mm cannons and braking parachute at the base of the rudder. This cannon's codename is Type 30-1.
 Shenyang J-6I – Single-seat day-fighter prototype with fixed shock cone on the intake splitter plate.
 Shenyang J-6II – Single-seat tactical fighter prototype with adjustable shock cone on a raked back intake splitter plate.
 Shenyang J-6III – Advanced version of the J-6A with radome on the splitter plate (rather than the shock cone centerbody) for a Chinese-made radar. May also have been designated J-6 Xin.
 Shenyang/Tianjin JJ-6 – (Jianjiji Jiaolianji – fighter trainer, a.k.a. Product 48 and FT-6) Chinese designed two-seat trainer, stretched 84 cm (33.1 in) to accommodate second seat, armed with one 30 mm cannon.
 Shenyang JZ-6 –  (Jianjiji Zhenchaji – reconnaissance fighter) Dedicated reconnaissance version with fuselage camera pack replacing cannon. As of April 2006, it was reported that the PLAAF 3rd Reconnaissance Regiment, 26 Air Division based in Nanjing MR, is the last regiment to actively fly the JZ-6 refusing to convert to JZ-8F. Exported as the Shenyang FR-6.
 Shenyang/Tianjin JJ-6 Testbed – Ejection seat testbed that succeeded H-5 ejection seat testbed.
 Xian BW-1 – Fly-by-wire flying controls test-bed for the Xian JH-7 flying control system.
 Guizhou J-6A – J-6A aircraft upgraded to carry two PL-2 (Pi Li – Thunderbolt) Infrared-homing air-to-air missiles. The first flight was on 21 December 1975.
 J-6W - unmanned variant, first reported in 2013.

Operators

Current operators

 People's Liberation Army Air Force – 35 JJ-6 in service as of December 2019.
 People's Liberation Army Naval Air Force – 14 JJ-6 in service as of December 2019.

 Myanmar Air Force – 1 in service as of December 2019.

 North Korea Air Force – 97 F-6s remain in service as of December 2019.

 Sudanese Air Force – 20 F-6s in service as of December 2019.

 Tanzanian Air Force – 3 F-6 fighters and 1 FT-6 trainer in service as of December 2019. 

 Zambian Air Force – 8 F-6 fighters and 2 FT-6 trainers in service as of December 2019.

Former operators

 Albanian Air Force – 82 J-6C models, retired as of 2005, but many in storage.

 Bangladesh Air Force

 Royal Cambodian Air Force

 Egyptian Air Force – replaced by F-16s

 Iranian Air Force

 Iraqi Air Force

 Pakistan Air Force - Operated 260 F-6 aircraft from 1965–2002. Replaced by Chengdu F-7Ps/F-7PGs

 Somali Air Corps – Somali F-6s were dumped and destroyed in the years following the disintegration of the SAC in 1991.

 Vietnam People's Air Force – retired in the 1990s.

Specifications (J-6)

See also

References

Notes

Bibliography

 
 Gordon, Yefim & Komissarov, Dmitry. Chinese Aircraft. Hikoki Publications. Manchester. 2008. .
 Gunston, Bill. The Osprey Encyclopaedia of Russian Aircraft 1875–1995. London, Osprey. 1995. 
 
 Taylor, Michael J.H. .  Jane's Encyclopedia of Aviation. Studio Editions. London. 1989. .
 Toperczer, Istvan. MiG-17 and MiG-19 Units of the Vietnam War. 2001, Osprey Publishing Limited. .
 Yeager, Chuck and Leo Janos. Yeager: An Autobiography. Page 396 (paperback). New York: Bantam Books, 1986. .
 Air Commodore Qadeer Ahmad Hashmi, "Final Salute to F-6", URL: Final Salute to F-6

External links

 Shenyang J-6 fighter photo collection and introduction in Chinese

China–Soviet Union relations
J-06, Shenyang
JJ-06
J-6
Mid-wing aircraft
Twinjets
Aircraft first flown in 1959
Second-generation jet fighters